Livo (Liu or Lio in local dialect) is a comune (municipality) in Trentino in the northern Italian region Trentino-Alto Adige/Südtirol, located about  north of Trento.

Livo borders the following municipalities: Rumo, Bresimo, Cagnò, Cis and Cles.

Demographic evolution

References

Cities and towns in Trentino-Alto Adige/Südtirol